The 1900 Kansas Jayhawks football team was an American football team that represented the University of Kansas as an independent during the 1900 college football season. In August 1900, Lawrence W. Boynton, a recent graduate of Cornell, accepted an offer to serve as the Kansas football coach.  In their only season under Boynton, the Jayhawks compiled a 2–5–2 record and were outscored by a total of 118 to 75. The Jayhawks played their home games at McCook Field in Lawrence, Kansas. Charles Wilcox was the team captain.

Schedule

References

Kansas
Kansas Jayhawks football seasons
Kansas Jayhawks football